Sir Drury Wray (1633–1710), was the 9th Wray Baronet, and third son of Sir Christopher Wray (1601–1646), by his wife Albinia Cecil, born on 29 July 1633.

Land owner
Wray obtained in 1674 grants of land in the counties of Limerick and Tipperary, which he forfeited by his loyalty to James II, on whose side he fought at the Battle of the Boyne. He succeeded his nephew, Sir Baptist Edward Wray, as ninth baronet of Glentworth about 1689, and died on 30 Oct. 1710, leaving, with female issue by his wife Anne, daughter of Thomas Casey of Rathcannon, co. Limerick, two sons, both of whom died without issue after succeeding to the baronetcy, the younger, Sir Cecil Wray, the eleventh baronet, on 9 May 1736, having acquired by entail the Glentworth and other estates. The title and estates thus passed to Sir Drury Wray's grand-nephew, Sir John Wray, bart., of Sleningford, Yorkshire, father of Sir Cecil Wray.

References
James McMullen Rigg, "Sir Drury Wray (1633–1710)", Dictionary of National Biography, 1885-1900, Volume 63
John Burke, "Sir Drury Wray", A Genealogical and Heraldic History of the Commoners of Great Britain and Ireland, Enjoying Territorial Possessions Or High Official Rank: But Uninvested with Heritable Honours, Volume 2, Published for Henry Colburn, by R. Bentley, 1835, page 633

1633 births
1710 deaths
Baronets in the Baronetage of England